Jeff VanderMeer (born July 7, 1968) is an American author, editor, and literary critic. Initially associated with the New Weird literary genre, VanderMeer crossed over into mainstream success with his bestselling Southern Reach Trilogy. The trilogy's first novel, Annihilation, won the Nebula and Shirley Jackson Awards, and was adapted into a Hollywood film by director Alex Garland. Among VanderMeer's other novels are Shriek: An Afterword and Borne. He has also edited with his wife Ann VanderMeer such influential and award-winning anthologies as The New Weird, The Weird, and The Big Book of Science Fiction.

VanderMeer has been called "one of the most remarkable practitioners of the literary fantastic in America today," with The New Yorker naming him the "King of Weird Fiction". VanderMeer's fiction is noted for eluding genre classifications even as his works bring in themes and elements from genres such as postmodernism, ecofiction, the New Weird and post-apocalyptic fiction.

VanderMeer's writing has been described as "evocative" and containing "intellectual observations both profound and disturbing," and has been compared with the works of Jorge Luis Borges, Franz Kafka, and Henry David Thoreau.

Early life and education
VanderMeer was born in Bellefonte, Pennsylvania in 1968, and spent much of his childhood in the Fiji Islands, where his parents worked for the Peace Corps. After returning to the United States, he spent time in Ithaca, New York, and Gainesville, Florida. He attended the University of Florida for three years and, in 1992, took part in the Clarion Writers Workshop.

When VanderMeer was 20, he read Angela Carter's novel The Infernal Desire Machines of Doctor Hoffman, which he has said "blew the back of my head off, rewired my brain: I had never encountered prose like that before, never such passion and boldness on the page." Carter's fiction inspired VanderMeer to both improve and be fearless with his own writing.

Career

Writing 

VanderMeer began writing in the late 1980s while still in high school and quickly became a prolific contributor to small-press magazines. During this time VanderMeer wrote a number of horror and fantasy short stories, some of which were collected in his 1989 self-published book The Book of Frog and in the 1996 collection The Book of Lost Places. He also wrote poetry—his poem "Flight Is for Those Who Have Not Yet Crossed Over" was a co-winner of the 1994 Rhysling Award—and edited two issues of the self-published zine Jabberwocky.

One of VanderMeer's early successes was his 2001 short-story collection City of Saints and Madmen, set in the imaginary city of Ambergris. Several of VanderMeer's novels were subsequently set in the same place, including Shriek: An Afterword (2006) and Finch (2009), the latter of which was a finalist for the Nebula Award for Best Novel. In 2000, his novella The Transformation of Martin Lake won the World Fantasy Award.

VanderMeer has also worked in other media, including on a movie based on his novel Shriek that featured an original soundtrack by rock band The Church. The band Murder By Death likewise recorded a soundtrack for Finch, which was released alongside a limited edition of the book. VanderMeer also wrote a Predator tie-in novel for Dark Horse Comics called Predator: South China Seas and worked with animator Joel Veitch on a Play Station Europe animation of his story "A New Face in Hell".

The Southern Reach Trilogy 

In 2014, Farrar, Straus and Giroux published VanderMeer's Southern Reach Trilogy, consisting of the novels Annihilation, Authority, and Acceptance. The story focuses on a secret agency that manages expeditions into a location known as Area X. The area is an uninhabited and abandoned part of the United States that nature has begun to reclaim after a mysterious world-changing event.

VanderMeer has said that the main inspiration for Area X and the series was his hike through St. Marks National Wildlife Refuge. The Other Side of the Mountain by Michel Bernanos is among the books VanderMeer has cited as also having had an influence.

The trilogy was released in quick succession over an 8-month period, in what has been called an innovative "Netflix-inspired strategy." The strategy helped the second and third books reach the New York Times Bestseller list, and established VanderMeer as "one of the most forward-thinking authors of the decade."

The series ended up being highly honored, with Annihilation winning the Nebula and Shirley Jackson Awards for Best Novel. The entire trilogy was also named a finalist for the 2015 World Fantasy Award and the 2016 Kurd-Laßwitz-Preis. Annihilation was also adapted into a film of the same name by writer-director Alex Garland. The film stars Natalie Portman, Gina Rodriguez, Tessa Thompson, Jennifer Jason Leigh, and Oscar Isaac.

Later writing 

In 2017 VanderMeer released Borne, a "biotech apocalypse" novel about a scavenger named Rachel trying to survive both a city "plunged into a primordial realm of myth, fable, and fairy tale" and a five-story-tall flying bear named Mord. As with the Southern Reach trilogy, the novel was highly praised, with The Guardian saying, "VanderMeer’s recent work has been Ovidian in its underpinnings, exploring the radical transformation of life forms and the seams between them." Publishers Weekly said the novel reads "like a dispatch from a world lodged somewhere between science fiction, myth, and a video game" and that with Borne Vandermeer has essentially invented a new literary genre, "weird literature."

Paramount Pictures has optioned the film rights to Borne.

In August 2017 VanderMeer released the novella The Strange Bird: A Borne Story. The stand-alone story is set in the same world as Borne but featuring different characters.

Dead Astronauts, a stand-alone short novel set in the Borne universe, was released on December 3, 2019.

VanderMeer's upcoming novels include Hummingbird Salamander, which is set ten seconds into the future and deals with "bioterrorism, ecoterrorism, and climate change," and a young adult series called Jonathan Lambshead and the Golden Sphere. He is also working on a story called "The Three," based on the dead astronauts mentioned in Borne, along with another Southern Reach story.

Literary criticism and editing 
VanderMeer is a frequent writer of critical literary reviews and essays, which have appeared in numerous publications including The Atlantic, The Washington Post Book World, Publishers Weekly, and other places. For a number of years he was a regular columnist for the Amazon book-culture blog and has served as a judge for the Eisner Awards, among others. He has been a guest speaker at such diverse events as the Brisbane Writers Festival, Finncon in Helsinki, and the American Library Association annual conference.

In 2019, VanderMeer was a judge for the National Book Award for Fiction.

VanderMeer has also edited a number of anthologies. He won a 2003 World Fantasy Award for Leviathan, Volume Three, a collection of genre-bending stories he edited with Forrest Aguirre. He and Mark Roberts were also finalists for the same award the next year for the anthology The Thackery T. Lambshead Pocket Guide to Eccentric & Discredited Diseases.

Most of his recent anthologies have been collaborations with his wife, Ann VanderMeer, the Hugo-award-winning former editor of Weird Tales. These anthologies include The New Weird, a collection of stories from New Weird authors; Last Drink Bird Head, a charity anthology benefiting literacy; The Weird, a World Fantasy Award winning collection of weird fiction; Time Traveler's Almanac, an anthology of time-travel fiction; Fast Ships, Black Sails, a pirate fiction anthology; and the Locus Award winning The Big Book of Science Fiction.

VanderMeer is the founding editor and publisher of the Ministry of Whimsy Press, which he set up in the late 1980s while still in high school. The press is currently an imprint of Wyrm Publishing. One of the Ministry'''s publications, The Troika by Stepan Chapman, won the Philip K. Dick Award in 1997.

 Teaching 
VanderMeer has been involved in teaching creative writing. One of the projects he is involved with is Shared Worlds, an annual two-week program that aims to teach creative writing to teenagers. VanderMeer has also taught at the Clarion Workshop and at Trinity Prep School. In addition to his teaching, VanderMeer has also written guides to creative writing such as Wonderbook, which won a BSFA Award, a Locus Award, and was nominated for a Hugo and World Fantasy Award.

 Critical reputation 
VanderMeer has been called "one of the most remarkable practitioners of the literary fantastic in America today," with The New Yorker naming him the "King of Weird Fiction." VanderMeer's fiction is noted for eluding genre classifications even as his works bring in themes and elements from genres such as postmodernism, ecofiction, the New Weird and post-apocalyptic fiction.

VanderMeer's fiction has been described as "evocative (with) intellectual observations both profound and disturbing" and "lyrical and harrowing," with his mixing of genres producing "something unique and unsettling."

VanderMeer's writing has been compared with the works of Jorge Luis Borges, Kafka, and Thoreau.

 Personal life 
In 2003, VanderMeer married Ann Kennedy, then editor for the small Buzzcity Press and magazine the Silver Web.  They have two cats. One is named Neo.

 Awards 

VanderMeer has been nominated for the World Fantasy Award 14 times. He has also won an NEA-funded Florida Individual Writers' Fellowship, and, the Le Cafard Cosmique award in France and the Tähtifantasia Award in Finland, both for City of Saints. He has also been a finalist for the Hugo Award, Bram Stoker Award, International Horror Guild Award, Philip K. Dick Award, and many others. Novels such as Veniss Underground and Shriek: An Afterword have made the year's best lists of Amazon.com, The Austin Chronicle, the San Francisco Chronicle, and Publishers Weekly, among others.

Other Awards include:

 2000 – World Fantasy Award for the novella The Transformation of Martin Lake 2003 – World Fantasy Award for his anthology Leviathan 3 (with Forrest Aguirre)
 2009 – World Fantasy Award nomination for Finch 2009 – Nebula Award nomination for Best Novel for Finch 2012 – World Fantasy Award for his anthology The Weird (with Ann VanderMeer)
 2013 – BSFA Award for Best Non-Fiction for Wonderbook 2013 – Locus Award for Best Non-Fiction for Wonderbook 2013 – Hugo Award nomination for Wonderbook 2013 – World Fantasy Award nomination for Wonderbook 2014 – Nebula Award for Best Novel for Annihilation 2014 – Shirley Jackson Award for Best Novel for Annihilation Bibliography 

 Novels 

 Dradin, In Love (1996, collected in all editions of City of Saints and Madmen)
 The Hoegbotton Guide to the Early History of Ambergris, by Duncan Shriek (1999, collected in all editions of City of Saints and Madmen)
 Veniss Underground (2003)
 Shriek: An Afterword (2006)
 Predator: South China Sea (2008)
 Finch (2009)
 Southern Reach Trilogy:
 Annihilation (2014)
 Authority (2014)
 Acceptance (2014)
 Absolution (forthcoming)
 Borne (2017)
 Dead Astronauts (2019) 
 The Misadventures of Jonathan Lambshead:
 A Peculiar Peril (2020)
 A Terrible Trouble (forthcoming)
 Hummingbird Salamander (2021)
 The Journals of Doctor Mormeck (forthcoming)
 The Book Murderer (forthcoming)
 The Stone Shed (forthcoming)
 Drone Love (forthcoming) 

 Nonfiction 

 
 
  (With S. J. Chambers)
 
 

 Collections 
 The Book of Frog (1989)
 The Book of Lost Places (1996)
 City of Saints and Madmen: The Book of Ambergris (2001)
 City of Saints and Madmen (2002, substantially expanded from the 2001 edition)
 City of Saints and Madmen (2004, expanded from the 2002 edition)
 The Day Dali Died (2003)
 Secret Life (2004)
 Why Should I Cut Your Throat? (non-fiction, 2004)
 VanderMeer 2005 (promotional sampler, 2005)
 Secret Lives (2006)
 The Surgeon's Tale and Other Stories (with Cat Rambo, 2007)
 The Third Bear (2010, Tachyon Publications)
 Area X: The Southern Reach Trilogy: Annihilation; Authority; Acceptance (2014)

Short fiction
 "Mansions of the Moon" (2001) in Nemonymous 1
 "My Report on the Secret Life of Shane Hamill" (2006) in Eidolon I (ed. Jonathan Strahan, Jeremy G. Byrne)
 "Fixing Hanover" (2008) in Extraordinary Engines and reprinted in The Mammoth Book of Steampunk (2012) ed. Sean Wallace
 The Mona Lisa (2009) in Halo: Evolutions
 The Strange Bird (2017)
 The World is Full of Monsters (2017)

 Other projects 

 The Kosher Guide to Imaginary Animals (with Ann VanderMeer, 2010, Tachyon Publications)

 Anthologies edited 

 Leviathan 1 (with Luke O'Grady, 1994)
 Leviathan 2 (with Rose Secrest, 1998)
 Leviathan 3 (with Forrest Aguirre, 2002)
 Album Zutique (2003)
 The Thackery T. Lambshead Pocket Guide to Eccentric & Discredited Diseases (with Mark Roberts, 2003)
 The New Weird (with Ann VanderMeer, 2007)
 Best American Fantasy (with Ann VanderMeer, 2007)
 Best American Fantasy: v. 2 (with Ann VanderMeer, 2008)
 Last Drink Bird Head, (2008)
 Steampunk (with Ann VanderMeer, 2008)
 Fast Ships, Black Sails, (with Ann VanderMeer, 2009) – Fantasy pirate stories
 Steampunk II: Steampunk Reloaded (2010)
 The Thackery T. Lambshead Cabinet of Curiosities (with Ann VanderMeer, 2011)
 The Weird (with Ann VanderMeer, 2012)
 The Time Traveler's Almanac (with Ann VanderMeer, 2014)
 Sisters of the Revolution: A Feminist Speculative Fiction Anthology (with Ann VanderMeer, 2015)
 The Big Book of Science Fiction: The Ultimate Collection (with Ann VanderMeer, 2016)
 The Big Book of Classic Fantasy (with Ann VanderMeer, 2019)
 The Big Book of Modern Fantasy (with Ann VanderMeer, 2020)

 References 

 External links 

 
 Golden Gryphon Press official site – About Secret Life''
 
 

1968 births
20th-century American male writers
20th-century American novelists
20th-century American short story writers
21st-century American male writers
21st-century American non-fiction writers
21st-century American novelists
21st-century American short story writers
American bloggers
American environmentalists
American fantasy writers
American horror writers
American male non-fiction writers
American male novelists
American male short story writers
American people of Dutch descent
American science fiction writers
American speculative fiction critics
Environmental fiction writers
Living people
Nebula Award winners
People from Bellefonte, Pennsylvania
Postmodern writers
Rhysling Award for Best Short Poem winners
Science fiction critics
Steampunk writers
Weird fiction writers
World Fantasy Award-winning writers
Writers of books about writing fiction